Tuffi (born in 1946 in India, died in 1989 in Paris) was a female Asian elephant that became famous in West Germany during 1950 when she accidentally fell from the Wuppertal Schwebebahn into the River Wupper underneath.

On 21 July 1950 the circus director Franz Althoff (de) had Tuffi, then four years old, travel on the suspended monorail in Wuppertal, as a publicity stunt. The elephant trumpeted wildly and ran through the wagon, broke through a window and fell  down into the River Wupper, suffering only minor injuries. A panic had broken out in the wagon and some passengers were injured. Althoff helped the elephant out of the water. Both the circus director and the official who had allowed the ride were fined.

Tuffi was sold to Cirque Alexis Gruss (fr) in 1968; she died there in 1989.

No photograph of the incident is known; a widely circulated postcard picture is a montage. 
A local milk-factory has chosen the name as a brand.

The Wuppertal tourist information keeps an assortment of Tuffi-related souvenirs, local websites show original pictures.

In 1970 Marguerita Eckel and Ernst-Andreas Ziegler published a children's picture book about the incident titled .

See also 
 List of historical elephants

References

 Stephan Oettermann: Die Schaulust am Elefanten. Eine Elephantographia curiosa. Syndikat:Frankfurt am Main 1982. Chapter Elefantenkatastrophen und „Wunder der Tierdressur“, S. 69-82; S. 73. . 

1946 animal births
1989 animal deaths
Circus animals
Individual elephants
Individual animals in Germany